Heinkel is a German language surname. It stems from a reduced form of the male given name Heinrich – and may refer to:
Don Heinkel (1959),  retired Major League Baseball pitcher
Ernst Heinkel (1888–1958), German aircraft designer

German-language surnames
Surnames from given names